is a school located in Seiyo, Ehime, Ehime, Japan, which was built in 1882, and is considered to be the oldest school in Shikoku. With its rare Giyōfū architectural style on  kaimei school was designated as one of the important cultural properties of Japan in May 1997. Today the school is a museum where 6,000 precious documents are stored and displayed including school textbooks in the Edo period through the early Shōwa period and documents on school administration.

References

See also 
 Uwa, Ehime
 Museum of Ehime History and Culture

Schools in Japan
Important Cultural Properties of Japan
Museums in Ehime Prefecture
History museums in Japan
Education museums
Giyōfū architecture
Seiyo, Ehime